The Seksarias are an industrialist family in India. It is a well recognised and respected family name in the Marwari Agrawal community in India. The Govindram Seksaria family originally came from the district called "Sekhsar" in Rajasthan, India, hence they chose the family name "Seksaria". 

In the early 20th century they were considered as stalwarts in industries like textiles, mining, printing, movie production, steel and equity markets. An iconic figure in the family, Mr Govindram Seksaria, was referred to as The Cotton King. The New York Cotton Exchange has erected a ziggurat in his honor inside the office building. Another well known industrialist in the family was Makhanlal Gordhandas Seksaria.

For many Indian industrialist families, the Nationalization Act had brought about significant changes. However, the Seksaria tradition is still carried on by the current generation of family torchbearers and the family residence (Haveli) in the Rajasthani village of Navalgarh.

External links
Seksaria website

Indian surnames